Madis is an Estonian masculine given name. As of 1 January 2020, 2,635 men in Estonia bear the name Madis. It is the 53rd most popular male name in Estonia. 

Notable Estonian people named Madis include:
 Madis Aruja (1936–1995), Estonian conservationist, geographer and ski-orienteer
 Madis Kallas (born 1981), Estonian decathlete
 Madis Kalmet (born 1955), Estonian actor and theatre director
 Madis Kõiv (1929–2014), Estonian writer, philosopher and physicist
 Madis Lepajõe (1955–2020), Estonian cyclist, sport figure and politician
 Madis Mihkels (born 2003), Estonian racing cyclist
 Madis Milling (1970–2022), Estonian actor, television and radio presenter and politician
 Madis Pärtel (born 1985), Estonian volleyball player
 Madis Üürike (born 1943), Estonian politician and financial expert
 Madis Vihmann (born 1995), Estonian football player

References

Estonian masculine given names